The 1984 Dallas Cowboys season was the team's 25th in the National Football League. The Cowboys finished the season with a record of nine wins and seven losses, and missed the playoffs for the first time in 10 years.  A division record of 3–5 caused them to finish fourth in the NFC East, despite equaling the overall records of the New York Giants and St. Louis Cardinals. A loss to the winless Buffalo Bills in week 12 cost the team a critical win. Nonetheless, the Cowboys had a 9-5 record and would have made the playoffs had they won one of their two remaining games, and would have won the division had they won both games. The team gave up a 15-point lead against the Washington Redskins in week 15, and then lost to the Miami Dolphins by one touchdown (surrendered with less than a minute to play) in the final week of the season. The season was overshadowed by a quarterback controversy between Danny White and Gary Hogeboom, with Hogeboom getting the majority of the starts.

Offseason
The Cowboys went through major changes during the offseason, as key players Drew Pearson, Billy Joe Dupree, Harvey Martin, Robert Newhouse, and Pat Donovan all retired, and Butch Johnson was traded to the Denver Broncos.

NFL Draft

Roster

Schedule

Division opponents are in bold text

Season summary

Week 1

Week 2

Week 3

Week 4

Week 5

Week 6

Week 7

Week 8

Week 9

Week 10

Week 11

Week 12
In their first visit to Rich Stadium and first overall to Buffalo since 1971, the Cowboys lost for the first time in four meetings with the Bills. The teams did not meet again until Super Bowl XXVII.

Week 13

Week 14

Week 15

Week 16

Standings

Season recap
The Cowboys announced that they would celebrate their 25th anniversary during the 1984 season under the theme "Silver Season".

The sale of the franchise from the Murchison family to an 11-member limited partnership headed by Dallas businessman Harvey Roberts ("Bum") Bright was approved by NFL owners on March 19 and the sale was completed on May 18.

Gary Hogeboom replaced Danny White as the starting quarterback in the preseason, and a quarterback controversy ensued throughout the season. After a 4–1 start, Hogeboom played poorly in losses to St. Louis and Washington, and was replaced by White in both games. The following week against New Orleans, White had to relieve Hogeboom again, this time after Hogeboom injured his right wrist early in the second half. White led the Cowboys to victory, overcoming a 21-point deficit in the fourth quarter.

White started the next two games, but after a poor performance by both quarterbacks against the Giants, Hogeboom regained the starting position. The constant change at quarterback didn't help the team's inconsistent play, and they reached their lowest point at Buffalo late in the season, suffering a humiliating 14–3 loss at the hands of the winless Bills. Afterwards, White would go on to start at quarterback for the rest of the season. Still, despite all the turmoil surrounding the Cowboys, they held a 9–5 record going into the season's final two weeks and were tied for the division lead. However, two heartbreaking losses to the Redskins (a game in which the Cowboys led 21–6 at halftime) and Dolphins ended the Cowboys' string of postseason appearances at nine.

The Cowboys perennially potent offense fell into disarray during the 1984 season. The offensive line was ravaged by injury and retirement, and Cowboy quarterbacks were under duress all season. The line also struggled to open holes for the running game, despite another productive season from running back Tony Dorsett, who rushed for 1,189 yards. Turnovers were another source of frustration, as the offense turned it over 42 times. The defense once again featured a strong pass rush, led by perennial all-pro defensive tackle Randy White, as well as an opportunistic secondary, with safety Michael Downs leading the way with seven interceptions. However, stopping the run was a problem throughout the season, as the defense allowed 4.4 yards per carry.

Awards
The Cowboys had three players represent them in the Pro Bowl: Randy White, Doug Cosbie, and Bill Bates, who became the first player to be chosen for the Pro Bowl for outstanding play on special teams coverage units. White was named to the associated press' All-NFL first team for his play at defensive tackle, while safety Michael Downs was named second team All-NFL, despite being overlooked for the pro bowl.

Publications
 The Football Encyclopedia 
 Total Football 
 Cowboys Have Always Been My Heroes

References

External links
 1984 Dallas Cowboys
 Pro Football Hall of Fame
 Dallas Cowboys Official Site
Dallas Cowboys 1984 season

Dallas Cowboys seasons
Dallas
Dallas